Raja Ja'afar ibni Almarhum Raja Muda Musa is the Raja Muda (crown prince) of Perak Darul Ridzuan since 20 June 2014.

Early life and education
He was born on 26 September 1941 at  Taiping Hospital, Taiping, in then Federated Malay States. Raja Jaafar is the son of the late Perak Raja Muda, Raja Musa ibni Al-Marhum Sultan Abdulaziz and his first wife, Cik Puan Mariam binti Encik Abdullah. He had his early education at Anderson School, Ipoh and Anglo-Chinese School, Teluk Intan before studying for his bachelor's degree at Universiti Malaya and then his master's degree in Public Administration at Cornell University, United States.

Government Service
Raja Ja'afar has a wide experience in public administration. He joined Perak State Secretariat in 1966, served in the District & Land Office from 1966 to 1971. From 1976 to 1979, he was a management consultant at the Prime Minister's Office. He became an under-secretary at the Higher Education Division of the Education Ministry from 1979 to 1984, and then secretary of the Foreign Investment Committee at the Economic Planning Unit and deputy secretary-general (Development and Finance) of the Defence Ministry before finally retiring from government service in 1996.

Raja Muda of Perak
As senior prince, Raja Ja'afar ibni Almarhum Raja Muda Musa was sworn in as the Raja Muda of Perak on 1 July 2014.

Personal life
His first wife was Raja Puan Besar Perak Raja Nor Mahani binti Almarhum Raja Shahar Shah (18 October 1942 - 3 October 2017); they have a son, Raja Shah Azman, and a daughter, Raja Nor Azwina.

After the death of his first wife, he married Raja Puan Mahkota Perak, Raja Nazhatul Shima on 12 January 2019. She had been widow since the death of her husband in 2017.

Ancestry

References

|-

1941 births
Living people
Malaysian people of Malay descent
Malaysian Muslims
Cornell University College of Human Ecology alumni
People from Perak
Royal House of Perak